Emil Quincy Brown (born December 29, 1974) is an American former professional baseball outfielder. He played in Major League Baseball (MLB) from 1997 to 2009 for the Pittsburgh Pirates, San Diego Padres, Kansas City Royals, Oakland Athletics, and New York Mets.

Career
Brown, who attended Chicago's Harlan High School, was drafted by the Oakland Athletics in the sixth round of the 1994 Major League Baseball Draft. He became the everyday center fielder during the  season, but Brown, who was considered a five-tool prospect, could never manage to capitalize on his potential, so he was traded to the San Diego Padres. Brown did not play in the majors from -. In  he emerged as the everyday starting right fielder for the Kansas City Royals. During this breakout year, Brown hit 17 home runs and drove in 86 with a .286 batting average.

During the  season, Brown batted .287 with 15 home runs and 81 RBI. He was ninth in the American League with 41 doubles.

On July 30, 2007, Brown shot Kansas City reporter Karen Kornacki in the eye with a plastic pellet gun. This happened when Kornacki was talking to his Royals teammate Tony Peña Jr. The Royals called it "an accident".

Despite limited playing time during the  season (113 games and 366 at-bats), Brown led the Royals in RBI for the third straight year. He and Carlos Beltrán are the only Royals to have led the team in RBI for three consecutive years.

On January 11, he signed with the Oakland Athletics. On March 26, 2008, Brown hit a 3-run homer in the A's victory over the Red Sox in the second game of the Opening Series at the Tokyo Dome in Tokyo, Japan.

On February 16, 2009, Brown signed a minor league deal with the San Diego Padres and was invited to spring training.

On May 28, 2009, Brown was acquired by the New York Mets and assigned to the Buffalo Bisons. Brown was called up in early June, only to be designated for assignment on June 6 to make room for Ryan Church on the Mets' roster. After being sent outright to Buffalo, he was released on July 22, 2009.

References

External links

Major League Baseball outfielders
New York Mets players
Oakland Athletics players
Kansas City Royals players
Pittsburgh Pirates players
San Diego Padres players
Arizona League Athletics players
West Michigan Whitecaps players
Indian River State Pioneers baseball players
Modesto A's players
Carolina Mudcats players
Nashville Sounds players
Portland Beavers players
Durham Bulls players
Louisville Bats players
Memphis Redbirds players
New Orleans Zephyrs players
Buffalo Bisons (minor league) players
African-American baseball players
1974 births
Living people
Baseball players from Chicago
21st-century African-American sportspeople
20th-century African-American sportspeople